Uno Aan (born in 1936) is an Estonian local historian and local cultural, sport figure. His work and activities are related to Järva County.

Awards:
 2008: Estonian Volunteer of the Year
 2012, he was awarded with Order of the White Star, V class

References

Living people
1936 births
20th-century Estonian historians
Recipients of the Order of the White Star, 5th Class
21st-century Estonian historians